Musarrat Misbah (born 25 November 1959) is a Pakistani beautician, entrepreneur, actress and philanthropist.

Early life 
She was born to Misbah Uddin Khan and Anisa on 25 November 1959 in Karachi, Pakistan. In 1980, she went to the United Kingdom where she attended Shaw College of Beauty Therapy.

Career 
She later established Depilex Smileagain Foundation, a nonprofit organization. In 1990s she worked in dramas on PTV. In 2010, she became the recipient of the Pride of Performance award for her contributions in the field of medical treatment and financial aid reportedly provided to the burn and acid attack victims for females in particular.

Masarrat Misbah was awarded by Italian government and making her the first Pakistani woman to receive awards by the Italian government on Women's Day for her courage and commitment.

Personal life 
Musarrat married Amir and she had two children with him later they divorced and Musarrat took the custoday of her children also her younger sister Nighat Misbah is the Director of Depilex.

Filmography

Television series

Awards and recognition

Controversies 
Since 2003, the NGO provided medical treatment for about seven hundred and sixty victims; however most of the victims died due to lack of facilities, though her organization was funded by the government and non government agencies.

In 2010, the Islamabad High Court seized her bank account for her alleged involvement in misusing funds she received from national and international agencies for her NGO which claimed to have provided medical and financial aid to burn victims. Depilex Smileagain Foundation allegedly collected funds from foreign charitable organizations after it alleged to have helped acid victims. The organization established by her was also donated two acre land for the establishment of hospital and training camps for the burn victims; however the project of PKR380,000,000 was not completed.

References

External links 
 

1959 births
20th-century Pakistani actresses
Living people
Pakistani philanthropists
Pakistani television actresses
21st-century Pakistani actresses
People from Karachi
Lux Style Award winners
Recipients of the Pride of Performance
Hum Award winners